The 2017–18 Moldovan Under-19 Division was the Moldovan annual football tournament. The season began on 26 August 2017 and ended on 9 June 2018. Zimbru Chișinău were the defending champions.

Stadia and locations

Squads
Players must be born on or after 1 January 2000, with a maximum of five players per team born between 1 January 1999 and 31 December 1999 allowed.

League table
The six clubs will play each other four times for a total of 20 matches per team.

Results 
Matches 1−10

Matches 11−20

References

2017–18 in Moldovan football